Ljusdal Municipality (Ljusdals kommun) is one of Sweden's 290 municipalities within Gävleborg County. Its seat is Ljusdal.

The municipality was formed in 1971 by the amalgamation of the market town (köping) of Ljusdal (instituted in 1914) with the rural municipalities Järvsö, Färila, Los and Ramsjö.

Ljusdal is known for its successful bandy team and for the annual Bandy World Cup that used to be held in the town.

Geography 
Geographically the town is located on the shores of the river Ljusnan, along the shores of which Sweden's northern main line railway (Norra Stambanan) stretches. The municipality calls itself "Sweden's nearest Norrland", with Norrland being  historically how Sweden's north was referred to. Geographically, the municipality is located at the centre of Sweden.

In this large municipality (Sweden's 25th largest) there are several nature activities one can enjoy. Along Ljusnan there are a total of 40 kilometers of water ways, with possibilities for sailing, rafting, fishing or taking a tour with the tour boats.
Hamra National Park is also located partly within the western parts of the municipality.

Localities 

Figures as of 2004, from Statistics Sweden:
 Ljusdal 7,559
 Järvsö 1,907
 Färila 1,542
 Tallåsen 807
 Los 469
 Hybo 351
 Ramsjö 306
 Hennan 227
 Korskrogen 202
 Kårböle 134

History 
The area had a large immigration from Finland in the 17th and 18th century in the western part of the municipality known as Orsa Finnmark (in Dalarna). Still there are many names which trace this Finnish influence. In Ljusdal a museum dedicated to the regions history is now located in a former dairy, and in Järvsö there is the Stenegård cultural centre.

The population was boosted when the mainline railway was constructed here in the late 19th century.

Tourism
Tourism in the municipality is focussed on Järvsö. Popular tourist activities in Järvsö include skiing on Järvsöbacken and visiting Järvzoo.

Nature
Gröntjärn Nature Reserve is located in Ljusdal Municipality around 20 kilometers north of Ljusdal. Here several Kettle holes formed during glacial retreat, where ice blocks melted under sediments. The pool is not fed by streams but by groundwater and can see large variations in the lake level. The ground water source also gives the lake it is characteristic turquoise-green colouring.

Sister cities
 Denmark : Glamsbjerg
 Norway: Tynset
 Finland: Ikaalinen
 Estonia: Vinni
 Germany: Schlieben

Gallery

See also
Järvsö
Bandy World Cup

References

External links

Ljusdal – official website
Sweden's Nearest Norrland –  tourism website in Swedish/English/German
Energy Flow Survey of Ljusdal's Municipality – pdf 
Energy flow survey of Ljusdals municipality (Abstract)

 
Municipalities of Gävleborg County